Rannoch School was an independent boarding school, located on the south shore of Loch Rannoch in Perth and Kinross, Scotland on the Dall Estate,  from Kinloch Rannoch.  Dall House served as the main school building and a boarding house.

It was established by three masters from Gordonstoun School and opened on 24 September 1959 with 82 boys. The founding masters were A.J.S. Greig (Headmaster and Housemaster of Dall House known as "Dougal"), P. Whitworth (Housemaster of Potteries House aka "Paddy" or "Spongy" to most of the pupils) and J. Fleming (aka "Gemflem").  The school's ethos was enshrined in its principle of "in pursuit of all round excellence" based on the philosophies of Kurt Hahn.

Rannoch's location in the Highland Perthshire glens lent itself well to Outward Bound pursuits, which became a large part of the school's activities.

Buildings
At its peak, Rannoch School had over 300 boarders (girls and boys) from ages 10 to 18. There were four boys' boarding houses: 
Dall (located in Dall House itself), Potteries, Wade, Wentworth; one girls' boarding house: Robertson; one junior boarding house: Cameron.

In 1997, to accommodate increasing numbers of girl pupils, Wentworth merged with Dall to become Duncan House, and Wentworth became a new girls' house, Struan.

Rannoch also had a modern sports centre, design centre, swimming pool, chapel and gym donated by the Prior family. It also housed a student built library.

Dall House

Dall House was the main school building. It housed two of the boys’ boarding houses, the dining hall, kitchens, masters common room and headmasters office, and in later years the girls boarding house.

The estate dates back to 1347. Dall House was built in 1855 as a principal seat of the Clan Robertson, which it remained until the early last century. In 1860 it was sold to Thomas Frederick Charles Vernon Wentworth of Yorkshire. It passed to his son Captain Bruce Vernon-Wentworth, who used to visit during the autumn shooting season. He took his staff from his main residence at Wentworth Castle in Yorkshire during the season and after the end of World War II lived there full-time until his death in 1951. 

He is buried at a private grave site by the burn adjacent to the house. The building is a romantically styled Scots Baronial mansion house designed by architects Thomas Mackenzie and James Matthews. Prior to being purchased by the school, it was used as offices by the Forestry Commission.

Academic
The school was one of a few in Scotland that taught SCE Higher grade subjects over two years, rather than one allowing a greater focus on extracurricular activities.  A small number of pupils on occasion took A-Levels instead. Subjects taught included English, Mathematics, Sciences, Music, Geography, Art, French, German, Modern Studies, Economics and Woodwork and Metalwork. Other schools that carry out this practice include Merchiston Castle School in Edinburgh.

Activities
In addition to the regular sporting activities, Rannoch was very active with The Duke of Edinburgh's Award Scheme, taking full advantage of the school's beautiful surroundings.

Rannoch also had its own volunteer emergency services. The school fire brigade, supported by Tayside Fire Brigade, was manned by pupils and staff to provide emergency cover for the local area. The remoteness of Loch Rannoch meant fires were rare, but on occasion 999 emergency calls resulted in the fire engine and crew being dispatched.

Three power boats furnished the Loch Patrol service and the mountain rescue service trained with Tayside Police to assist with missing hill walkers. Other services included ambulance, conservation, expedition, meteorological, library and a specially developed building service.

Sports also played a large part at Rannoch, with pupils participating in games four days per week including, rugby, football, hockey, golf (Scotland's only 8-hole golf course), rounders, cross-country skiing, rowing (in coxed fours) and sculling, sailing, basketball, tennis, Judo, cycling, some ice skating, some ice hockey and athletics.

Academically, all main subjects were taught, mostly aiming towards Scottish Certificate of Education Standard Grade and Higher Grade exams, but also on occasion to A-Level. A large number of pupils participated in music, either learning an instrument or singing in one of the choirs.

Evening clubs and societies were also popular and a range of activities from electronics and filmmaking, to chamber choir and bible study. During the early years, the pupils converted an old barn on the site into a chapel and this remained a central focal point for daily worship.

Closure in 2002
In 2002, Rannoch School closed permanently, having been threatened with closure the previous year but lasting another 12 months through financial donations and publicity. Although the demand for independent schooling in Scotland is on the increase, recent years have shown a decline in the number of parents willing to send their children to boarding school. The remoteness of Rannoch and lack of public transport meant that opportunities for day pupils were very limited, being  from the nearest village and an hour's drive from the nearest city (Perth).

Old Rannochians

Rannoch produced a number of distinguished alumni known as "Old Rannochians", including:

David Brudenell-Bruce, Earl of Cardigan
Graeme Lamb, British General
Patrick Singleton, Bermudian luger
Tom Smith, 1971-2022 International Rugby Player: Scotland (61 caps) and British & Irish Lions (6 caps over 2 tours)

Rannoch School today
Following closure, the buildings and grounds of Rannoch School were bought by a private developer, Malcolm James. Rannoch school was due to be turned into an exclusive club for the rich but was refused by local planners.

See also
 Blairmore School
 Cademuir International School
 Oxenfoord Castle School
 St Margaret's School, Edinburgh

References

Defunct private schools in Scotland
Defunct boarding schools in Scotland
Educational institutions established in 1959
1959 establishments in Scotland
Educational institutions disestablished in 2002
2002 disestablishments in Scotland
 
Defunct schools in Perth and Kinross